Buthoscorpio sarasinorum is a species of scorpion in the family Buthidae. It is endemic to Sri Lanka. It is not known fatal to humans.

Description
Total body length is 25 to 52 mm. Dentate margin of pedipalp chela is movable finger with distinct granules. Tergites and carapace are smooth to finely granular. Median eyes are located anteriorly. Dorsolateral carinae of metasomal segments III to IV are well developed. Dorsum of metasomal segments are mesially granulated. Metasomal segments I to V are granulated. Both sexes have 14 to 17 number of pectinal teeth. Telson lacks the subaculear tooth.

References

Buthidae
Animals described in 1891
Scorpions of Asia